The Malagasy language of Austronesian origin, is generally spoken throughout the island. The official languages of Madagascar are Malagasy and French.  Madagascar is a Francophone country, and in 2022, French is spoken by around a quarter of the population in Madagascar, i.e. 7.7 million people out of 29.1 million (26.5%).

In the first Constitution of 1958, Malagasy and French were named the official languages of the Malagasy Republic.

No official languages were mentioned in the Constitution of 1992. Instead, Malagasy was named the national language; however, many sources still claimed that Malagasy and French were official languages, as they were de facto. In April 2000, a citizen brought a legal case on the grounds that the publication of official documents in the French language only was unconstitutional. The High Constitutional Court observed in its decision that, in the absence of a language law, French still had the character of an official language.

In the Constitution of 2007, Malagasy remained the national language while official languages were reintroduced: Malagasy, French, and English. The motivation for the inclusion of English was partly to improve relations with the neighboring countries where English is used and to encourage foreign direct investment. English was removed as an official language from the constitution approved by voters in the November 2010 referendum. These results were not recognized by the political opposition or the international community, who cited lack of transparency and inclusiveness in the organization of the election by the High Transitional Authority.

Minority languages 
Maore Comorian, also called Comorian, Comores Swahili, Komoro, Comoro, or Shimaore, has two dialects, Maore, and Shindzwani/Shindzuani. It is considered threatened by the Endangered Language Project.

References

External links
  Linguistic map of the world/ Madagascar
 Malagasy-English Bilingual Dictionary